Marianne Gravatte (born December 13, 1959, in Hollywood, California) is an American model and actress. She was chosen as Playboy magazine's Playmate of the Month for the October 1982 issue, then as the 1983 Playmate of the Year. Her original pictorial was photographed by Richard Fegley.

Career 
After being noticed in Playboy magazine by Ratt band member Stephen Pearcy, Gravatte appeared in the video as Stephen Pearcy's girlfriend for the band's song "Lay It Down". She was also featured on the front cover of the song's parent album, Invasion of Your Privacy, Ratt's second record, which was released in 1985.

She posed for Playboy again for the April 1994 "Playmate Revisited" feature.

Personal life 
Gravatte left modeling and now, with her husband, Mark E. Larsen, runs a sports bar. She is the mother of three sons.

TV appearances 
 Mickey Spillane's Mike Hammer ... Brenda - in the episode "Dead Man's Run" (1984) .... Brenda
 Matt Houston - in the episode "The Bikini Murders" (1984)

Other appearances 
 A cameo appearance in the music video "Something to Grab For" by Ric Ocasek (1983)
 A cameo appearance in the music video "No Tellin' Lies" by Zebra (1984)
 A cameo appearance in the music video "Lay it Down" by the rock band Ratt (1985)
 Appeared in Jocks Movie Poster (1987) Not in the movie https://www.imdb.com/title/tt0093315/mediaviewer/rm3836824320
 From 1988 to 1990, she worked as a bartender in tight jeans at "Out of Bounds Sports Bar" in Huntington Beach, California.  Her then husband, Mark, owned the popular local sports bar with live music, dancing and billiards.
 The June 1983 issue of Playboy featuring Gravatte as Playmate of the Year appears in episode 20 (Everybody Hates Playboy) of the first season of Everybody Hates Chris.

Playboy Appearances 

 August 1982 "California Girls" - page 149
 October 1982 PMOM - page 108-119
 January 1983 "Dear Playboy" -page 18
 January 1983 "Playmate Review" - page 180
 January 1983 "Playmates' Progress" - page 189
 June 1983 "Playmate of the Year" - page 136-153, 162 (text)
 September 1983 "Dear Playboy" - page 15
 November 1983 Subscription Ad - page 24-25
 December 1983 "Giant Calendar Ad" - page 101
 May 1984 "World of Playboy" - page 13
 October 1984 "Stuck On Memphis" - page 125-127
 February 1985 "Next Month" - page 194
 March 1985 "Understudies" - page 120, 122, 124-125
 January 1986 "Potpourri" - page 246
 January 1994 "40 Memorable Years" - page 92
 April 1994 "Playmate Revisited" - page 74-77
 October 1996 Ad - page 165
 January 1997 "Video Ad" - page 38
 March 1997 "Glamourcon" - page 119
 January 2000 "Centerfolds of the Century" - page 120

 NSS, Books, & Supplements

 2nd 15 Years - page 103
 Girls of Summer 1983 - page 7, 29
 Girls of Summer 1984 - page 5-7, 56-57, 108-109
 Girls of Summer 1988 - page 107
 Girls of Summer 1989 - page 45
 Girls of Summer 1990 - page 53
 Girls of Winter 1984 - page 36-37, 66-67
 Girls of Winter 1988 - page 77, 91
 Women of Television 1984 - page 99
 Book of Lingerie #1 - page 1, 108, 109
 Book of Lingerie #2 - page 62-65, 96
 Book of Lingerie #3 - page 18-19, 48, 49
 Book of Lingerie #4 - page 102-103
 Book of Lingerie #5 - page 24, 91
 Book of Lingerie #6 - page 44, 45
 Book of Lingerie #8 - page 11, 29
 Book of Lingerie #10 - page 6
 Book of Lingerie #11 - page 43
 Book of Lingerie #74 - page 51
Book of Lingerie #78 - page 82
 Blondes, Brunettes, & Redheads 1985 - page 44-47
 Blondes, Brunettes, & Redheads 1990 - page 27
 Bathing Beauties 1989 - page 68
 Sporting Women - page 30, 31
 Holiday Girls - page 14, 104-105
 Women On the Move - page 77
 Fantasies II - page 16-25
 Calendar Playmates - page 18, 27, 32
 Celebrating Centerfolds #1 - page 69
 Centerfolds Of The Century - page  61
 Facts & Figures - page 8, 47
 Midnight Playmates supplement - page 4, 14
 Nudes 1990 - page 54, 108
 Nudes 1991 - page 61
 Playmates in Paradise - page 58-61
 Playmates of the Year 1986 - page 94-99
 Playmates of the Year 2000 - page 48, 49
 Playmates of the Year 2013 - page 50, 51
 Photography - page 4-13 and cover
 Pocket Playmates #3 - page 5
 21 Playmates II - page 78-81 and cover
 Wet & Wild Women 1987 - page 26, 27
 Wet & Wild Playmates 1994 - page 70
 Sexy, Sassy & Sophisticated - page  20, 78-79
 Playmate Book 50 - page 242-243, 262, 263
 Playboy Book 50 - page 263

 Foreign Playboy

 Japan September 1982 "California Girls" - page 193 
 Spain October 1982 PMOM - page 52-63
 France October 1982 PMOM - page 56-67
 Netherlands October 1982 PMOM - page 69-79
 Japan November 1982 PMOM - page 129-141
 Australia December 1982 PMOM - page 7, 76-87
 Italy January 1983 PMOM - page 58-69
 Italy June 1983 "La Playmate Dell Anno" - page 100-111
 France June 1983 "La Victoire de Marianne" - page 28-37
 Mexico June 1983 "Playmate del Ano" - page 62-71
 Japan July 1983 "Playboy People" - page 9
 Japan July 1983 "Playmate of the Year" - page  78-85
 Netherlands July 1983 "Playmate of the Year" - page 99-101
 Spain July 1983
 Australia August 1983  "US Playmate of the Year" - page 84-91
 Spain October 1983 "La Playmates Del Ano" - page 70-77
 Australia April 1985 "Undercover" 134-137
 Japan May 1985 "Understudies" - page 167, 169, 170-171
 Argentina October 1985 PMOM  - page 152-163
 Australia October 1985 "Subscription Ad"
 Greece April 1986 "Playmate Review" - page 96, 98
 Turkey April 1986 PMOM - page 59-71
 Turkey July 1986 "Subscription Ad" - page 26-27
 Turkey March 1987 "Subscription Ad" - page 114-115
 Hong Kong April 1988 PMOM - page 88-102
 Turkey January 1989 - page 75
 Italy July 1994
 Turkey September 1994 "Playmate Revisited" - page 112-115
 Australia January 1995  "Playmate Revisited"
 Japan May 1999 "Best of Playmates 1960-1998" - page 67
 Croatia February 2001
 Italy June 2002 "Le Grandi Playmates Del Passato - page 100-104
 Netherlands May 2011 "Retro Bloot" - page 32
 Croatia October 2016 "Flashback" - page 136

See also
 List of people in Playboy 1980–1989

References

External links 
 
 

1959 births
Living people
American television actresses
Actresses from Hollywood, Los Angeles
1980s Playboy Playmates
Playboy Playmates of the Year
20th-century American actresses
21st-century American women